The Lead Plaque of Magliano (or Lead Plate of Magliano or Lead Disk) contains 73 words in the Etruscan language, including many names of mostly underworld deities. It was found in 1882, and dates to the mid 5th century BC. It is now housed in the National Archaeological Museum in Florence.

Description
The plaque weighs 191 grams and is curved in the shape of a lens. Its diameter is 7 cm at its narrowest point and 8 cm at its widest point. Only a few written monuments of Etruscan have survived on metal plates. The arrangement of the text is just as unusual as the shape and texture of the disk. The slab is inscribed with spiral Etruscan letters on both sides, reminiscent of the Phaistos Disc. The creation of the artifact is dated to around 450 BC. The lead plate was found in February 1882 in a field 2 km southeast of Magliano in the Albegna river valley, near the former monastery of Santa Maria in Borraccia.

Content
The text seems to be a series of dedications to various gods and ancestors (in bold below): Cautha, "the gods of this place," Maris Menita, and "the ancestors" (af-r- or "forefathers" < ap "father") on side A; Thanr and Calus, Suri, Tin in the area of Lur, and (?) in the area of Lur, on side B. Other information includes where the dedications (sacrifices? offerings?) are to take place (casthia, lac, fal-za, chim "the slaughter place," leśca all in locative -th(-i)), how often (avil-s "annually" on side A, "every four years"? on side B), with what (musl = "honey wine?" and thu-n "first-ling"? also on side B), who is to perform them ("priest" cepen "of the village of the year" tuthiu avils), and for whom ("on behalf of tnuca"?; "for the beloved ancestors" afrs . naces both on side B). Much of the rest is obscure.

The text
With over 70 individual words, the text differs significantly from the thousands of short Etruscan grave inscriptions. It is among the longest in the Etruscan language. The text is written on both sides (referred to here as side A and side B), from right to left, as is usual in Etruscan texts. The text is also unusual in that it spirals inward, to be read clockwise from the outside to the inside. Most words are separated by a period.

Side A
| Lead Plaque of Magliano, Side A

| Lead Plaque of Magliano, Side A, transcription
cauthas . tuthiu . avils /LXXX/ ez . chimthm . casthialth . lacth . hevn . avil . neśl . man . murinaśie . falzathi ⁝
mariśl menitla . afrs . cialath . chimth . avilsch . eca . cepen . tuthiu . thuch . ichu 
tevr . heśni . mulveni . eth . zuci . am . ar

Side B
| Lead Plaque of Magliano, Side B

| Lead Plaque of Magliano, side B, transcription
mlach thanra calusc . ecnia . iv avil . mi menicac . marca lurcac . eth . tuthiu . nesl . 
man . rivach . leścem . tnucasi . 
śuris . eis teis . evi tiuras . mulsle mlach ilache 
tins . lursth . tev huvi thun 
lursth sas afrs . naces

Partial translation and notes
From van der Meer.

Side A:
"For Cautha the village (rite/priest) of the year, 80 ez, in addition in the slaughter (place) [or "in the offering place" according to Rix], at castia [stream? lake?], in lac-, [during]hev- annually, of the deceased the monument > the monument [man] of the deceased [neś-l], belonging to (the) Murina (family), in a small heavenly place."
"Of the gods (is that) which of/for this (place/ritual) make [mene] and have (taken care of?) [mlach-the literally "made beautiful"] the magistrature [marni] (and) the village,  monthly [tiu], in addition in the slaughter (place), in casthia, [and] in lac-."
"For Maris Menita (the Maker), for the ancestors, cialath, in addition in the slaughter (place), and of the year this priest of the village > and this village-priest of the year, (the) ichu house [thuch];"
"O referees, heśni (and) consecrate! This (is) (the) announcement: be (present), make (carry out)!"

Side B:

"O beautiful (deity) of Thanr and Calus ecnia (subj. pro imp.?) IV year (each 4 years?); I (am) of Meni, Mar(is) and Lur. This (rite/priest) of the village, of the deceased (nesl)"
"the monument of the deceased rivax, in addition in the leśca on behalf of/by/during tnuca." 
"For Suri god teis on the ev- of months [with] muls-le (‘honey wine’?), (as) a good thing, during the feast"
"for Tin in the area of Lur, O referee, huvi (imp., offer?) a first thing > firstling"
"in the area of Lur self for the ancestors beloved > for the beloved ancestors themselves [sa-s]."

Notes:
Most of the gods mentioned are associated with the underworld, including Cautha (often mentioned with Suri), Calus (a god of wolves, sometimes used as an epithet of Tin(ia)), Suri, and Lur (though Pittau considers this last to be connected to Latin laurus "laurel" and hence to Apollo). The word tin on side B is assumed here to be a form of the theonym Tinia, the Jupiter-like head of the Etruscan pantheon, but it could also mean "day." If the sequence mi menicac marca lurcac include abbreviations of the terms maris and menita from side A, then it should be read as "I (am the lead plaque) of (the god) Maris the Maker and of (the god) Lur." The term Maris on side A refers to a set of deities represented on mirrors as babies, but little else is known of their function. Pittau, on the other hand, considers it a name for Cupid/Eros.

The family name Murina on side A is well known, since inscriptions indicate that members lived in Tarquinia, Volsinii, the Siena region, Chiusi, and Perugia.

References

Sources
Bonfante, G. & L. Bonfante. The Etruscan Language: An Introduction. 2nd Edition. Manchester University Press, Manchester/New York 2002, pp. 214–220.
Bonfante, L. Reading the Past: Etruscan. University of California Press, 1990, pp. 25, 28, 50.
Cristofani, M. Dizionario della civiltà etrusca. Giunti Gruppo Editoriale, Florenz 1999, p. 154.
Deecke, W. "Die Bleitafel von Magliano." in: Rheinisches Museum für Philologie. Neue Folge. Volume 39, 1884, pp. 141–150.
Goldmann, E. Beiträge zur Lehre vom indogermanischen Charakter der etruskischen Sprache. Gerold & Co., Vienna 1936, pp. 219–252.
de Grummond, N. & E. Simon. The Religion of the Etruscans. University of Texas Press, Austin 2006, pp. 57–61.
Hooker, T. J. (ed.) Reading the Past: Ancient Writing from Cuneiform to the Alphabet. University of California Press, Berkeley 1990, pp. 346, 376–377.
Pallottino, M. The Etruscans. Penguin, 1975, pp. 117, 142-143, 199, 221-222.
Pallottino, M. Etruscology: History and Culture of the Etruscans. 7th edition, Springer, Basel 1988, pp. 421, 480–482.
Pittau, M. Studi sulla lingua etrusca. Ipazia Books, Sassari 2016, pp. 155–163.
Rendini, P and M. Firmati. Archeologia a Magliano in Toscana. Siena 2003.
Teza, E. "Di una iscrizione etrusca trovata in Magliano." in: Rivista di filologia e di istruzione classica. Volume X, 1882, pp. 530–534.
Torp, A. Etruskische Beiträge. Volume 3, 1902–1906.
van der Meer, L. B. "The Lead Plaque of Magliano." in: C. Chiaramonte, G. Bagnasco, F. Chiesa (Eds): Interpretando l’antico. Scritti di archeologia offerti a Maria Bonghi Jovino. Monduzzi Editoriale, Mailand 2013, pp. 257–275.

External links

Etruscan inscriptions

The Etruscans in Tuscany: Magliano in Tuscany